The Bear is the third studio album by the nu metal band Element Eighty. It was released in 2005 through Texas Cries Records, which is the band's own label. The physical album was only made available through the band's official website and at shows. Downloads and streams are available on iTunes, Amazon, Spotify, and 7Digital in MP3, AAC, and CD-quality FLAC-formats.

Track listing
 "Guntruck" - 3:22
 "Victims" - 2:56
 "The Sacrifice" - 3:32
 "War" - 3:27
 "Killing Me" - 2:41
 "The Itch" - 3:19
 "Boars" - 2:26
 "Price to Pay" - 3:42
 "Spite" - 2:59
 "Beaumont" - 2:46

References

2005 albums
Self-released albums
Element Eighty albums